The Australian brushturkey or Australian brush-turkey or gweela (Alectura lathami), also frequently called the scrub turkey or bush turkey, is a common, widespread species of mound-building bird from the family Megapodiidae found in eastern Australia from Far North Queensland to Eurobodalla on the South Coast of New South Wales. The Australian brushturkey has also been introduced to Kangaroo Island in South Australia. It is the largest extant representative of the family Megapodiidae, and is one of three species to inhabit Australia.

Despite its name and their superficial similarities, the bird is not closely related to American turkeys, nor to the Australian bustard, which is also known as the bush turkey. Its closest relatives are the wattled brushturkey, Waigeo brushturkey, and malleefowl.

Biology

Description

It is a large bird with black feathers and a red head. The subspecies A. l. purpureicollis from the northern Cape York Peninsula is smaller than the more widespread nominate subspecies. It has a prominent, fan-like tail flattened sideways, and its plumage is mainly blackish, but with a bare red head, and a yellow (in the nominate subspecies) or purple wattle (in A. l. purpureicollis). The males' wattles become much larger during breeding season, often swinging from side to side as they run. The males' heads and wattles also become much brighter during the breeding and nesting season. The underside of the body is sprinkled with white feathers, more pronounced in older birds. The brushturkey is a clumsy flyer and cannot fly long distances, only taking to the air when threatened by predators or to roost in trees at night and during the heat of the day.

Nesting

Mound-building is done by a dominant male, and visited by a succession of local females, for mating and egg-laying. The male works tirelessly, collecting material from all around, and also diligently repelling rival males, which are keen to usurp his position. The effort involved eventually wears him down, and he will ultimately be defeated by a new king. The eggs are very large (90 × 45 mm), and the young are fully fledged on hatching. They can fly within hours, as soon as the feathers are dry. The eggs are hatched by the heat of the composting mound, the temperature of which is regulated by adding or removing material to maintain the temperature in the  incubation temperature range. The Australian brushturkey checks the temperature by sticking its beak into the mound. Like some reptiles, incubation temperature affects the sex ratio of chicks, but the mechanism is different between reptiles and these birds, with reptiles exhibiting temperature-dependent sex determination, and megapodes exhibiting temperature-dependent embryo mortality. The sex ratio in brushturkeys is equal at incubation temperatures of 34 °C, but results in more males when cooler and more females when warmer. Whether the parents use this to manipulate the sex of their offspring by, for instance, selecting the nesting site accordingly, is unclear. Warmer incubation also results in heavier, fitter chicks, but how this is linked to sex is also unknown.

The same nesting site is frequently used year after year, with the old nests being added to each breeding season. The average clutch of eggs is between 16 and 24 large white eggs, which are laid September to March. Sometimes, up to 50 eggs laid by several females may be found in a single mound. The newly hatched young dig themselves out of the mound and then have to care for themselves.

Predators and human interactions
Brushturkey eggs are a favourite food of goannas, snakes, and dingoes and dogs, though brushturkeys were also a staple of Aboriginal Australians. Often, goannas exhibit wounds on their tails from having been pecked by brushturkeys that ferociously chase them away from their nests. Chicks are left to fend for themselves from their hatching so they have a high death rate.

In situations where they come into contact with humans, such as picnic areas in national parks and suburban gardens, brushturkeys exhibit little fear and often boldly attempt to steal food from tables and raid compost bins. Brush-turkeys in more urbanized areas show reduced fear compared to birds in national parks. They nest in suburban gardens, and in search of material for their nests remove enormous amounts of mulch from gardens.

Habitat
The Australian brushturkey inhabits rainforests and wet sclerophyll forests, but can also be found in drier scrubs and open areas. In the northern part of its range, the Australian brushturkey is most common at higher altitudes, but individuals move to the lowland areas in winter. In the south, it is common in both mountain and lowland regions.

Brushturkeys are now common in urban environments and can be found in backyards in both Brisbane and Sydney.

The range of the Australian brushturkey extends from the top of Cape York to approximately the area around Wollongong.

Population
Brushturkeys are fairly common presently, but in the 1930s, the bird was supposed to be approaching extinction.

Human interaction
The Australian brushturkey can damage gardens when raking up the ground looking for food. It can also cause extensive damage to food crops. The Department of Environment, Climate Change, and Water provides hints for living with brushturkeys in urban environments.

They are sometimes hunted for food, including as part of the diet by Aboriginal Australians. Their eggs, which weigh on average , are also sometimes eaten.

The Australian brushturkey is fully protected in Queensland. Under the Nature Conservation Act 1992 it is an offence to harm brush turkeys. For a class 1 offence it is 3000 penalty units or two years imprisonment. For a class 4 offence it is 100 penalty units or A$13,345.00. 

In New South Wales, shooting a brush turkey has resulted in fines of up to A$22,000, under the Biodiversity Conservation Act.

Gallery

References

Further reading
 Edden, R. and Boles, W.E. (1986). Birds of the Australian Rainforests. Sydney: Reed Books.
 Marchant, S. and Higgins, P.J. (eds.) (1993). Handbook of Australian New Zealand and Antarctic Birds. Vol. 2: Raptors to Lapwings. Melbourne: Oxford University Press.
 Olsen, P., Crome, F. and Olsen, J. (1993). The Birds of Prey and Ground Birds of Australia. Sydney: Angus and Robertson, and the National Photographic Index of Australian Wildlife.

External links

 Australian Brush-turkey videos, photos & sounds on the Internet Bird Collection
 Deterring brush turkeys – New South Wales Government 
 Factsheets — Brushturkey

Articles containing video clips
Australian brushturkey
Endemic birds of Australia
Birds of New South Wales
Birds of Queensland
Australian brushturkey
Australian brushturkey